Ruyuan (postal: Yuyuan), officially Ruyuan Yao Autonomous County, is a county of northern Guangdong province, China, with a small border with Hunan to the northwest. It is under the administration of Shaoguan City.

Climate

References

External links 

 
County-level divisions of Guangdong
Shaoguan
Yao autonomous counties